The Nimbus satellites were second-generation U.S. robotic spacecraft launched between 1964 and 1978 used for meteorological research and development. The spacecraft were designed to serve as stabilized, Earth-oriented platforms for the testing of advanced systems to sense and collect atmospheric science data. Seven Nimbus spacecraft have been launched into near-polar, sun-synchronous orbits beginning with Nimbus 1 on August 28, 1964. On board the Nimbus satellites are various instrumentation for imaging, sounding, and other studies in different spectral regions.  The Nimbus satellites were launched aboard Thor-Agena rockets (Nimbus 1–4) and Delta rockets (Nimbus 5–7).

Over a 20-year period from the launch of the first satellite, the Nimbus series of missions was the United States' primary research and development platform for satellite remote sensing of the Earth. The seven Nimbus satellites, launched over a fourteen-year period, shared their space-based observations of the planet for thirty years. NASA transferred the technology tested and refined by the Nimbus missions to the National Oceanic and Atmospheric Administration (NOAA) for its operational satellite instruments. The technology and lessons learned from the Nimbus missions are the heritage of most of the Earth-observing satellites NASA and NOAA have launched over the past three decades.

Contributions

Weather forecasting

At the time of its launch, the idea that intangible properties such as air pressure could be observed using a satellite orbiting hundreds of miles above the Earth was revolutionary. With each Nimbus mission, scientists broadened their ability to collect atmospheric characteristics that improved weather forecasting, including ocean and air temperatures, air pressure, and cloudiness.  Beginning with the Nimbus 3 satellite in 1969, temperature information through the atmospheric column began to be retrieved by satellites from the eastern Atlantic and most of the Pacific Ocean, which led to significant forecast improvements. The global coverage provided by Nimbus satellites made accurate 3–5 day forecasts possible for the first time.

The ability of the Nimbus satellites to detect electromagnetic energy in multiple wavelengths (multi-spectral data), in particular the microwave region of the electromagnetic spectrum, made it possible for scientists to look into the atmosphere and tell the difference between water vapor and liquid water in clouds. In addition, they were able to measure atmospheric temperature even in the presence of clouds, a capability that allowed scientists to take the temperature in the "warm core" of hurricanes.

Radiation budget
One of the most important scientific contributions of the Nimbus missions was their measurements of the Earth's radiation budget. For the first time, scientists had global, direct observations of the amount of solar radiation entering and exiting the Earth system. The observations helped to verify and refine the earliest climate models, and are still making important contributions to the study of climate change. As scientists consider the causes and effects of global warming, Nimbus radiation budget data provide a base for long-term analyses and make change-detection studies possible. The Nimbus technology gave rise to current radiation-budget sensors, such as the CERES instruments on NASA's Terra and Aqua satellites.

Ozone layer
Even before the Nimbus satellites began collecting their observations of Earth's ozone layer, scientists had some understanding of the processes that maintained or destroyed it. They were pretty sure they understood how the layer formed, and they knew from laboratory experiments that halogens could destroy ozone. Finally, weather balloons had revealed that the concentration of ozone in the atmosphere changed over time, and scientists suspected weather phenomena or seasonal change were responsible. But how all of these pieces of information worked together on a global scale was still unclear.

Scientists conducted experiments from NASA experimental aircraft and proved that atmospheric chemicals such as the chlorofluorocarbons (CFCs) released from refrigerants and aerosol sprays did destroy ozone. As Nimbus 7 satellite observations accumulated between 1978 and 1994, it became increasingly clear that CFCs were creating an ozone hole each winter season over Antarctica. Not only that, but despite some year-to-year variations, it appeared the hole was becoming larger. The Nimbus measurements made clear how severe the ozone hole problem was.

Sea ice
Nimbus satellites collected orbital data on the extent of the polar caps in the mid-1960s, recorded in the visible and infrared parts of the spectrum. These first global snapshots of Earth's icecaps provide invaluable reference points for climate change studies. During a narrowing window of opportunity for data archaeology, the National Snow and Ice Data Center (NDISC) and NASA were able to recover data that allowed the reconstruction of high-resolution Nimbus 2 images from 1966 showing the entire Arctic and Antarctic ice caps.

When the Nimbus 5 spacecraft launched in 1972, scientists planned for its Electrically Scanning Microwave Radiometer to collect global observations of where and how much it rained across the world. However, a new priority for the sensor evolved in the months following its launch: mapping global sea ice concentrations. When Nimbus 7 launched in 1978, technology had improved enough for scientists to distinguish newly formed (i.e., "first year") sea ice from older ice, with the Scanning Multichannel Microwave Radiometer (SMMR) sensor. The data it collected during its 9-year lifespan provide a significant chunk of the long-term record of Earth's sea ice concentration that today's scientists use for studies of climate change.

Among the most serendipitous discoveries that the Nimbus missions made possible was that of a gaping hole in the sea ice around Antarctica in the Southern Hemisphere winters of 1974–76. In a phenomenon that has not been observed since, an enormous, ice-free patch of water, called a polynya, developed three years in a row in the seasonal ice that encases Antarctica each winter. Located in the Weddell Sea, each year the polynya vanished with the summer melt, but returned the following year. The open patch of water may have influenced ocean temperatures as far down as 2,500 meters and influenced ocean circulation over a wide area. The Weddell Sea Polynya has not been observed since the event witnessed by the Nimbus satellites in the mid-70s.

Global positioning system
Nimbus satellites (beginning with Nimbus 3 in 1969) blazed the trail into the modern GPS era with operational search and rescue and data collection systems. The satellites tested the first technology that allowed satellites to locate weather-observation stations set up in remote locations and to command the stations to transmit their data back to the satellite. The most famous demonstration of the new technology was through the record-breaking flight of British aviator Sheila Scott, who tested the Nimbus navigation and locator communication system when she made the first-ever solo flight over the North Pole in 1971.

The Nimbus ground-to-satellite-to-ground communication system demonstrated the first satellite-based search and rescue system. Among the earliest successes were the rescue of two hot air balloonists who went down in the North Atlantic in 1977 and, later that year, tracking a Japanese adventurer on his first attempt to be the first person to dogsled solo to the North Pole through Greenland. Tens of thousands of people over the past three decades have been rescued through the Search and Rescue Satellite-aided Tracking (SARSAT) operational system on NOAA satellites.

Nuclear power
Nimbus-3 was the first satellite to use a SNAP-19 radioisotope thermoelectric generator (RTG) in space. A previous attempt was made to launch a SNAP-19 RTG on Nimbus-B-1, but the rocket was destroyed and the nuclear fuel landed in the Santa Barbara Channel. This power source augmented the solar array with an additional  of electrical power.

Operation history of the Nimbus satellites

See also
Coastal Zone Color Scanner

References

External links

http://nssdc.gsfc.nasa.gov/earth/nimbus.html Nimbus Program
http://nssdc.gsfc.nasa.gov/earth/nimbus_sensor.html Experimental Instrumentation on-board Nimbus satellites

Weather satellites of the United States
Remote sensing programs
Satellite series
NASA programs